Inner Mongolia Medical University is a university in Inner Mongolia, under the authority of the Autonomous Region government. It is in Hohhot, the capital city of Inner Mongolia Autonomous Region. It was renamed from Inner Mongolia Medical College in 2012.

The main campus is downtown about 400 m west of the central square on the north side.

The new campus was opened in 2006: 35 km west of downtown and 8 km west of JinChuan. Teachers, except foreign teachers, take the free university bus from downtown to the new campus. It is a 45-minute ride.

References

External links
Official website

 
Education in Hohhot
Universities and colleges in Inner Mongolia
Medical schools in China